The Air Energy AE-1 Silent is a German self-launching ultralight sailplane powered by an electric motor. Designed and built by Air Energy, the AE-1 Silent is also marketed by Alisport of Italy, see Alisport Silent 2 Targa. It first flew in August 1997.

Design and development
The Silent is a conventional composite monoplane glider with a retractable 13 kW (17 hp) electric motor driving a 1.92m propeller.

The aircraft was originally marketed with a nickel–cadmium battery pack, but in 2005 this was replaced with a lithium polymer battery system that gives three times the range of the early installation.

Specifications

References

External links

 AE1-1 Silent

Glider aircraft
1990s German sailplanes
Motor gliders
Mid-wing aircraft
Single-engined tractor aircraft
T-tail aircraft
Aircraft first flown in 1997